Santino Solari (1576 – April 10, 1646), was an Italian architect and sculptor, who worked mainly in Austria.  He was born at Verna near Como.

In 1612, he was appointed chief architect of Salzburg by the archbishop Markus Sittikus. His work introduced north Italian early baroque to Austria. Solari died in Salzburg and is buried in the St. Peter's Cemetery there.

Works
Fortifications in the city and province of Salzburg (e.g., in Neumarkt am Wallersee)
Schloss Hellbrunn with its trick fountains
Salzburg cathedral after having modified the plans by Vincenzo Scamozzi

His son, Ignazio Solari, executed, together with Fra Donato Mascagni, the frescoes in the Salzburg Cathedral. He also painted the altar piece "Burial of Christ" on the north wall of the cathedral.

References

16th-century Italian architects
17th-century Italian architects
16th-century Italian sculptors
Italian male sculptors
17th-century Italian sculptors
1576 births
1646 deaths